Tsvetelina Yordanova Stoyanova (born  in Sofia, Bulgaria) is a Bulgarian group rhythmic gymnast. She is the 2008 European Junior bronze medalist in rope. She won the gold medal in the Group-all around the 2014 World Championships.

Career 
Stoyanova is member of the Bulgarian National team since 2006 and competed in international competitions since 2008. Stoyanova is a veteran and competed in numerous world championships, including at the 2014 World Championships where she was member of the Bulgarian Group that won gold in the group all-around and silver in 3 Balls/2 Ribbons. She competed at the 2015 European Games in Baku. At the 2015 World Championships, the Bulgarian group won a silver in group all-around and bronze medal in 6 Clubs/2 Hoops.

Accident
In June 2016, Stoyanova survived a high fall - she fell from the sixth floor of her apartment in Sofia just a few days after withdrawing from training due to health problems. She was severely injured and underwent multiple surgeries, including having her spleen removed. She was taken out of intensive care in August 2016 and will continue rehabilitation. Her rhythm gymnastic teammates dedicated their  bronze medal in the group all-around competition at the Rio 2016 Olympics to Stoyanova.  Stoyanova left the hospital in September, and had her first public appearance in five months by attending the rhythm gymnastics' team farewell show at Arena Armeec in November.

References

External links 
 

1994 births
Living people
Bulgarian rhythmic gymnasts
Gymnasts from Sofia
Gymnasts at the 2015 European Games
European Games competitors for Bulgaria
Medalists at the Rhythmic Gymnastics European Championships
Medalists at the Rhythmic Gymnastics World Championships